Palaeoryctes (Greek: "old" (palaeos), "digger" (oryctes)) is an extinct genus of mammal from Middle to Late Palaeocene of North America.

Palaeoryctes resembled a modern shrew, being slender and sharp-nosed, with typical insectivore teeth. The molars of Palaeoryctes had little function other than piercing.

References

Cimolestans
Paleocene mammals
Paleocene mammals of North America
Prehistoric mammal genera